William Bowles is an American politician who represented the 2nd Bristol District in the Massachusetts House of Representatives from 2009 to 2011. He had previously served as a member of the Attleboro, Massachusetts City Council.

References

Democratic Party members of the Massachusetts House of Representatives
People from Attleboro, Massachusetts
Living people
Year of birth missing (living people)